The Unbreakable trilogy, also known as the Eastrail 177 Trilogy, is an American superhero thriller and psychological horror film series. The films were written, produced, and directed by M. Night Shyamalan. The trilogy consists of Unbreakable (2000), Split (2016), and Glass (2019).

The entire franchise features the character David Dunn. The series has been noted for its differences from more traditional superhero films, with Shyamalan's work referred to as "the first auteur shared superhero universe". It is the first superhero franchise that is written and directed by one person, in comparison to other popular films in the genre. Shyamalan has noted that while it is based on comic book superheroes, and refers to comic books, it is not actually derived from comic book material itself. In contrast to most superhero films, the series is also generally grounded in reality, and is seen as a deconstruction of the superhero genre. The series is thus considered to be a unique take on the superhero genre.

The filmmaker has stated that the films are origin stories of people with unique gifts, with the intent being to acknowledge that every person has something special about them. Unbreakable has been labeled the first grounded superhero film, while Split has been called the first solo supervillain origin story, and Hollywood's first stealth sequel.

Development 
The series originated with the film Unbreakable, directed by Shyamalan and released in 2000. When M. Night Shyamalan conceived the idea for Unbreakable, the outline had a comic book's traditional three-part structure (the superhero's "birth", his struggles against general evil-doers, and the hero's ultimate battle against the "archenemy"). Finding the birth section most interesting, he decided to write Unbreakable as an origin story. At the time, comic book themed superhero films were niche, so the film was marketed as a psychological thriller like Shyamalan's breakout film The Sixth Sense, rather than as a superhero film. According to Shyamalan, "I was on a conference call with the studio, and they were saying we can't mention the word 'comic books' or 'superheroes' because it's too fringe".

Upon release in 2000, Bruce Willis revealed that Unbreakable was the first part of a planned trilogy. Both Willis and Samuel L. Jackson pushed for a sequel or trilogy, with Willis stating "It's really built as a trilogy," but Shyamalan expressed uncertainty and said, "I can't tell you anything about them." Whether the film had a sequel depended upon how it would perform at the box office. While Unbreakable was a moderate box office success, grossing  worldwide on a  budget, it performed below expectations, earning about a third of what The Sixth Sense grossed. Unbreakable gained more popularity over time and subsequently developed a cult following, as the audience for comic book superhero films grew over time. Out of Shyamalan's career, some have referred to Unbreakable as his best work. In terms of superhero films, it was listed in Times list of "Top 10 Superhero Films" of all time, ranked at number four. Quentin Tarantino also included Unbreakable on his list of top 20 films released since 1992.

The second film Split originated from the character of Kevin who had been in one of the early drafts of Unbreakable, but Shyamalan had pulled the character out, stating there were balancing issues at that time. With Split, he brought in some of the scenes he had written for Unbreakable around Kevin. Split became a box office success, with over 2,000% return on investment (ROI), making it the most profitable film of 2017, paving the way for a third film. While Shyamalan has stated that he is usually not a fan of making sequels, the stars of the first film, Bruce Willis and Samuel L. Jackson, had asked him to consider making a sequel. Shyamalan then planned to make a trilogy, finally releasing the third film, Glass, in 2019 as the last. He has said he may continue making more if the inspiration for writing the material is there.

Films

Unbreakable (2000) 

David Dunn is the sole survivor of a devastating train wreck. Elijah Price is a mysterious stranger who offers a bizarre explanation as to why Dunn escaped without a single scratch, an explanation which threatens to change Dunn's family and his life forever.

During filming for The Sixth Sense, M. Night Shyamalan approached Bruce Willis for the role of David Dunn. Sometime after, Samuel L. Jackson and Willis were announced to be the two leads of the film. Prior to the film's production, Jackson met with Willis discussing the script. Principal photography began April 25, 2000, and finished in June the same year.

Split (2016) 

Kevin Wendell Crumb has evidenced 23 personalities to his trusted psychiatrist, Dr. Karen Fletcher, although there remains one still submerged who is set to materialize and dominate all of the others. Compelled to abduct three teenage girls led by the wilful, observant Casey Cooke, Crumb reaches a war for survival among all of those contained within him, as well as everyone around him, as the walls between his compartments shatter.

In October 2015, James McAvoy was cast as the film's primary antagonist, Kevin Wendell Crumb. Originally, Joaquin Phoenix was cast for the role. The same month, Anya Taylor-Joy, Betty Buckley, Jessica Sula, and Haley Lu Richardson were cast in the film. Following cast announcements, Universal Pictures revealed the film's title as Split. Principal photography began in November 2015 and finished in June 2016.

Glass (2019) 

Following the events of Split, security guard David Dunn uses his superstrength and supernatural abilities to track Kevin Wendell Crumb. As Dunn and Crumb engage in a series of escalating encounters, Elijah Price orchestrates everything from the background, all the while holding secrets critical to both men.

Bruce Willis, Samuel L. Jackson, Spencer Treat Clark, Charlayne Woodard, James McAvoy, and Anya Taylor-Joy reprise their roles from Unbreakable and Split. In July 2017, Sarah Paulson was cast as a new character revealed to be Dr. Ellie Staple. In November, Adam David Thompson was cast in an undisclosed role. Principal photography began in October and finished in December 2017.

Future 
Although the series was conceived as a trilogy, Shyamalan mentioned that he was open to a continuation if the inspiration came to him. However, on January 8, 2019, he officially confirmed that no sequels are currently planned, saying he has no interest in building a cinematic universe.

Themes 
While the three movies are superhero films, in that unrealistic "super" powers are featured, Shyamalan notes that one of the main themes of the movies is that there are extraordinary powers in everyone. He also notes that rather than being a "comic book movie" each of them is a movie about comic books. While the movies are connected, each has a separate style. Unbreakable is a mystery film, regarding a man who is the sole survivor of a catastrophic train crash. Split is a horror movie, exploring the origin story of a supervillain, while Shyamalan has stated that Glass would have a different thematic feel as well. Producer Jason Blum has referred to them as "superhero movies", noting that they are very different from Marvel Studios' films.

Cast and crew

Cast

Additional crew and production details

Reception

Box office performance 
Unbreakable was a moderate box office success, grossing  in ticket sales on a  budget, but there was minimal profit and it performed below expectations, earning about a third of what The Sixth Sense grossed. Unbreakable underperformed at the box office due to several reasons, primarily because many people expected it to be a similar film to Shyamalan's smash success psychological horror film, The Sixth Sense, which it was not.

Split grossed $278 million against a $9 million budget, becoming a surprise box office success. Split became a box office success, with over 2,000% return on investment (ROI), making it the most profitable film of 2017 and one of the most profitable films of all time.

Critical reception

Accolades

References

External links 
 
 
 Official Split website
 

 
Film series introduced in 2000
American film series
Superhero horror films
Touchstone Pictures franchises
Universal Pictures franchises
American psychological horror films
Horror film series
Films directed by M. Night Shyamalan
Films with screenplays by M. Night Shyamalan
Thriller film series
Trilogies